Wery may refer to:

Places
Wery, Kuyavian-Pomeranian Voivodeship, a village in Poland
Wery, Warmian-Masurian Voivodeship, a village in Poland

People
Henk Wery (born 1943), Dutch footballer
Carl Wery (1894–1975), German actress
Leonard Wery, Dutch field hockey player
Laurent Wéry (born 1975), Belgian DJ
Marthe Wéry (1930–2005), Belgian painter